The Utile Dulci was a learned and musical Academy and Secret Society in Stockholm in Sweden. It was founded in memory of Olof von Dalin in 1766, and held its last session in 1795.

History
The Utile Dulci was alongside the Royal Swedish Academy of Letters, History and Antiquities the predecessor of the Swedish Academy (1786) and the Royal Swedish Academy of Music (1771), and the Utile Dulci suffered hard competition when the latter was founded. It was an important part of the Swedish culture life and, among other things, hosted public concerts. During the 1780s, it had 540 members.

Notable members
 Anna Maria Lenngren
 Hedvig Löfwenskiöld
 Johan Gabriel Oxenstierna
 Anna Charlotta Schröderheim  
 Nils Lorens Sjöberg 
 Anna Brita Wendelius
 Georg Adlersparre

Sources 
 Utile Dulci i Nordisk familjebok (andra upplagan, 1921)
 Nationalencyklopedin

1766 in Sweden
1766 establishments in Sweden
Learned societies of Sweden
1795 disestablishments in Europe
Music in Stockholm
Sweden during the Age of Liberty
Sweden during the Gustavian era